The  was a world's fair held in what is now part of the Minami Ward of Nagoya city, Japan from 15 March to 31 May in 1937.

History
Sponsored by the Japanese government and with HIH Prince Higashikuni Naruhiko as chairman, the Nagoya Pan-Pacific Peace Exposition was intended to promote industry, transportation, education, science, construction, architecture, social welfare, tourism, fine arts and crafts. Each of the participating nations or colonies had its own pavilion to promote its products and culture, and each of the prefectures of Japan (with the exception of Tottori and the external territories of Taiwan, Karafuto and Korea) also had a pavilion. In addition, major Japanese industries also sponsored their own pavilions.

Over the two and a half months of operation, the Nagoya Exhibition received more than 4,800,000 visitors, or roughly four times the population of the greater Nagoya area at the time. Daily attendance averaged at 61,643 people.

List of participating countries

Japan
Manchukuo
Siam
Netherlands East Indies
Brazil
China
Mysore
Singapore
Philippines
Mexico
Guatemala
Honduras
Costa Rica
El Salvador
Panama
Venezuela
Colombia
Peru
Chile
Australia
French Indochina
Burma
Ceylon
Union of South Africa
Argentina
Canada
Cuba
United States

The Second Sino-Japanese War erupted only two months after the Exposition closed.

See also 
 World Design Exhibition 1989
 Expo 2005

External links 
Early Showa era Nagoya: "Nagoya Pan Pacific Peace Expo” - Video, maps and photos of the exhibition (Japanese)
Virtual tour of site with photos of exhibition pavilions

World's fairs in Nagoya
Empire of Japan
1937 in Japan
History of Nagoya
1937 festivals